The 2021 season was Bunyodkor's 15th season in the Uzbekistan Super League; they finished the season in fifth position and reached the semi-final of the Uzbekistan Cup.

Season events
On 19 February, Bunyodkor announced the signings of Sanjar Rashidov and Odiljon Abdurakhmanov whilst extending their contracts with Davron Ergashev, Ulugbek Raimov, Sudaysiy Juraboev and Islam Karimov.

On 20 February, Bunyodkor extended their contract with Shakhboz Erkinov for an additional year, and another two years with Lutfulla Turaev.

On 1 March, Bunyodkor announced the signing of Ibrahim Tomiwa, Dian Talkhatov and Zafar Safaev, whilst Sarvar Karimov and Lubomir Bondarenko had extended their contracts for the 2021 season.

Squad

Transfers

Winter

In:

Out:

Summer

In:

Out:

Friendlies

Competitions

Overview

Uzbek League

League table

Results summary

Results by round

Results

Uzbek Cup

Group stage

Knockout stage

Squad statistics

Appearances and goals

|-
|colspan="14"|Players away on loan:
|-
|colspan="14"|Players who left Bunyodkor during the season:

|}

Goal scorers

Clean sheets

Disciplinary Record

References

Sport in Tashkent
FC Bunyodkor seasons
Bunyodkor